Sharon Leah Bird (née Reed, born 15 November 1962) is a former Australian politician. Sharon Bird served as an Australian Labor Party (ALP) member of the Australian House of Representatives, representing the Division of Cunningham in New South Wales from 2004 to 2022. Bird served as a minister during the late Gillard-Rudd years until Labor lost government at the next election. Sharon Bird served as the Shadow Minister for Vocational Education from October 2013 until July 2016. In 2021, Bird announced she would not be re-contesting at the 2022 Federal Election, retiring from politics.

Background and early career
Bird was born in Wollongong, and was educated at the University of Sydney and the University of Wollongong. She was a TAFE and high-school teacher before entering politics. She worked as an electorate officer for Colin Hollis, the member for the adjoining seat of Throsby, and was then a Senior Project Officer with the New South Wales Department of Juvenile Justice. Bird was a member of the Shellharbour Council between 1991 and 1995.

Political career
Bird first contested the seat of Cunningham at the 2002 by-election held following the resignation of Labor's Stephen Martin. Despite Bird polling 38.13% of the primary vote, the Australian Greens' Michael Organ won the seat on a two-party-preferred basis.

Bird contested Cunningham again in the 2004 general election. Although she took a large early lead, she was unable to secure victory until Organ was eliminated and his preferences flowed overwhelmingly to her, allowing her to win on the 10th count.

On 2 March 2012, Bird was appointed as Parliamentary Secretary for Higher Education and Skills, and was promoted as Minister for Higher Education and Skills in a rearrangement of the Second Gillard Ministry on 25 March 2013. In July 2013, Bird was appointed as the Minister for Regional Development, the Minister for Regional Communications and the Minister for Road Safety in the Second Rudd Ministry.

Bird is a supporter of same-sex marriage, voting in favour on the issue 3 times.

On 19 November 2021 Bird announced that she would not be contesting the 2022 election, retiring after 18 years as the member for Cunningham.

See also
 Second Gillard Ministry
 Second Rudd Ministry

References

External links
 
 

|-

|-

|-

|-

1962 births
Living people
Australian Labor Party members of the Parliament of Australia
Members of the Australian House of Representatives
Members of the Australian House of Representatives for Cunningham
Labor Right politicians
People from Wollongong
University of Sydney alumni
University of Wollongong alumni
Women members of the Australian House of Representatives
21st-century Australian politicians
21st-century Australian women politicians
Government ministers of Australia
Women government ministers of Australia